Robert Noble (1910–1990) was a Canadian physician involved in the discovery of vinblastine.

Robert Noble may also refer to:

Robert Noble (company), Scottish textile company established 1666
Robert Noble (artist) (1857–1917), Scottish landscape artist
Robert Noble Jones (1864–1942), New Zealand lawyer, public servant and land court judge
Robert Houston Noble (1861–1939), US Army general who commanded the 158th Infantry Brigade
Robert Noble (actor), actor in Held for Ransom (2000 film)
Robert Noble (diplomat), see List of Canadian diplomats

See also
Bobby Noble (disambiguation)
Bob Noble (disambiguation)
Roberto Noble (1902–1969), Argentine politician, journalist and publisher
Ronald Noble, American law enforcement officer

Noble, Robert